The Central American Cross Country Championships (Spanish: Campeonato Centroamericano de Campo Traviesa) are an annual Cross country running competition organized by CADICA for athletes representing the countries of its member associations. They were established in 2007. Races are featured for senior (Mayor), junior (U-20, Juvenil A), youth (U-18, Juvenil B), and two age groups (U-16, (Juvenil C) starting in 2008, and U-14, (Infantil A) starting in 2012) for both male and female athletes.

Editions

Results 
Complete result list were published on the CADICA website.  Results for the junior and youth competitions can be found on the World Junior
Athletics History ("WJAH") webpage.

Men's results

Senior

Junior U-20 (Juvenil A)

Youth U-18 (Juvenil B)

U-16 (Juvenil C)

U-14 (Infantil A)

Women's Results

Senior

Junior U-20 (Juvenil A)

Youth U-18 (Juvenil B)

U-16 (Juvenil C)

U-14 (Infantil A)

Mixed Results

Mixed Relay Senior and U-20

Mixed Relay U-18, U-16, and U-14

See also
IAAF World Cross Country Championships
NACAC Cross Country Championships
Central American and Caribbean Cross Country Championships
South American Cross Country Championships

References

External links
CADICA
World Junior Athletics History

CADICA competitions
Cross country running competitions
Recurring sporting events established in 2007
Athletics team events